Air Commodore Denis Fenn Rixson  (12 December 1918 – 10 December 1994) was a British pilot during World War II and a senior Royal Air Force officer in the post-war years and a Commandant Royal Observer Corps.

During World War II, he was the Officer Commanding No. 113 Squadron.

References

External links
Air of Authority – A History of RAF Organisation – Air Commodore D F Rixson

|-

Royal Air Force officers
British World War II pilots
People of the Royal Observer Corps
Commanders of the Royal Victorian Order
Officers of the Order of the British Empire
Recipients of the Distinguished Flying Cross (United Kingdom)
Recipients of the Air Force Cross (United Kingdom)
English aviators
Military personnel from London
1994 deaths
1918 births